Sala Khunnawut (also spelled Kunnawut; born 5 April 1962) is a 2021 National Artist  Performing Arts (International Thai Music - Composing Thai Luk Thung Songs), Thai Luk thung songwriter and singer from the Isan area. Currently, he is a songwriter and producer for the record label Grammy Gold, a network label of GMM Grammy.

Early life
He is the son of Bunlai and Kan Kunnawut and was born in Amnat Charoen Province. He graduated from Ubon Ratchathani Rajabhat University and started to teach at Ban Rai Khee School, Amnat Charoen Province.

Music career
In 1982, he left teaching to compose and produce the songs of Rungphet Laemsing. Currently, he is an artist, singer, songwriter and producer for the record label Grammy Gold. He is behind the success of many famous Luk thung Isan singers including Mike Phiromphon, Phai Phongsathon, Siriporn Ampaipong, Tai Orathai, Monsit Khamsoi and Monkaen Kaenkoon.

In 2016, he composed and sang the popular song Law Soo Larn Fang to mourn the death of King Bhumibol Adulyadej who died on 13 October 2016.

Personal life
He is married to Laddawan Khunnawut and they have two daughters.

Discography

Songs
 2001 - Uay Porn Nong Phen
 2016 - Lao Soo Lan Fang

Songwriting
 Jod Mai Phod Song (artist, Monsit Khamsoi)
 Dok Ya Nai Pa Poon (artist, Tai Orathai)
 Khor Jai Kan Nao (artist, Tai Orathai)
 Jao Chay Khong Chiwit (artist, Tai Orathai)
 Yark Mee The Pen Faen (artist, Phai Phongsathon)
 Yang Koay Thee Soay Dueam (artist, Monkaen Kaenkoon)

References

Sala Khunnawut
Sala Khunnawut
Sala Khunnawut
1962 births
Living people
Sala Khunnawut
Sala Khunnawut
Sala Khunnawut
Sala Khunnawut